Mama Africa may refer to:

Music 

 Mama Africa (Peter Tosh album), 1983
 Mama Africa (Yemi Alade album), 2016
 "Mama Africa" (song), by Akon from his 2006 album Konvicted
 "Mama Africa", a song by Yemi Alade from the album of the same name
 "Mama África", a song by Brazilian singer Chico César
 "Mama Africa", a song by Swedish band Panetoz

Other uses 
 Miriam Makeba (1932–2008), South African singer and civil rights activist, also known as Mama Africa
 Mama África, a 2011 documentary film by Mika Kaurismäki about Miriam Makeba
 Mama África FC, a Philippine football club that participated in the inaugural year of the United Football League